Until that Day is an EP by the Easy Star All-Stars. Every track is original except for the final track, which is a dub version of their own version of Radiohead's "Climbing Up the Walls" that was featured on their last cover album Radiodread. The EP is available to download from the Easy Star records website in MP3 and in FLAC formats.

Track listing

Got to Get Away (4:30)
Bed of Rose (4:02)
Like the Stars (4:24)
Until That Day (4:33)
The Finest (3:32)
Dubbing Up the Walls (4:11)

External links
 Until That Day

2008 EPs
Easy Star All-Stars albums
Easy Star Records albums
Albums produced by Michael Goldwasser